Mount Hope is a ghost town in Licking County, in the U.S. state of Ohio.

History
By 1917, Mount Hope was described as "virtually extinct".

References

Geography of Licking County, Ohio